Yehude Simon Munaro (born 18 July 1947) is a Peruvian politician, who served as Governor of the Lambayeque Region between 2003 and 2008, Prime Minister between 2008 and 2009 and as a Congressman from Lambayeque between 2011 and 2016, elected under the Alliance for the Great Change. He ran for the presidency in 2016, then shortly announced his withdrawal.

Early life and education
Born in Lima, Simon's family moved to the city of Chiclayo to establish a shoe retail business. After completing his early education at the Colegio Manuel Pardo, he joined the Faculty of Veterinary Medicine at the Universidad Nacional Pedro Ruiz Gallo, in the city of Lambayeque, where he later was a lecturer. He married Nancy Valcárcel, a Chiclayo painter with whom he had four children: Jessica, Yehude, Yusef and Yail, also he had ten grandchildren: David, Micaela, Joaquín, Nicole, Salvador, Belén, Rafaella, Santiago, Isabella and Julián.
He is a corrupted politician.

Political career

Early political career 
Yehude Simon began his political career in 1983, when he ran for the post of Mayor of prosperous Chiclayo city under the United Left, and was placed second. In the 1985 general elections, he ran in the Chamber of Deputies under the United Left, and was elected Deputy for the Lambayeque Region for the 1985-1990 term, integrating the Committees on Justice and Human Rights Congress.

In 1991, he founded the Free Patriotic Movement, who was accused of being the legal wing of the MRTA (Túpac Amaru Revolutionary Movement) rebel movement, famous for the 1996-97 Japanese embassy hostage crisis in Lima. On 5 April 1992, Simon was in Europe, participating in conferences. Upon learning of the breakdown of the constitutional President Alberto Fujimori he returned to Peru and decided to participate in the protest against the closure of the Congress of Peru.

Arrest and imprisonment
On June 11, 1992, he was arrested along with other leaders of Patria Libre, and accused of subversion. Later that year he was sentenced by the judiciary to 20 years of imprisonment for the crime of "glorification of terrorism." During his eight and a half years in prison, human rights organizations, Amnesty International, some media and some opposition Peruvian politicians demanded that the Fujimori regime to pardon him.  In November 2000, during the Transitional Government headed by President Valentín Paniagua Corazao, Simon was pardoned and released by the then Minister of Justice, Diego García Sayán. He was held for 8 years and six months.

Post-imprisonment: Governor of Lambayeque 

In the 2002 regional elections, Yehude Simon ran for president of the Lambayeque Regional Government and electorally defeated the Peruvian Aprista Party candidate Luis Falla, which is considered one of the most popular political parties in northern Peru. In his first four years of his regional presidency, the government carried out works focused mainly on the rural sector, among which the most notorious is the tender for the construction of the Olmos Project.

In December 2005, the Decentralist Concertation Alliance was signed between the Peruvian Humanist Movement, the Party for Social Democracy - Peru Commitment, Ayllu Self-Government and other regionalist organizations. The presidential formula was headed by Susana Villarán and she participated unsuccessfully in the presidential elections.

In the regional elections of 2006, which were held on the third Sunday of the month of November of that year; Yehude Simon ran and won the elections again, defeating the Peruvian Aprista Party (for the second time) and the Independent Solidarity Friendship Movement.

Since July 2008 he has been the president of the moderate center-left Peruvian Humanist Party.

Prime Minister of Peru 
On October 14, 2008, Simon was sworn in as President of the Council of Ministers, a position akin to that of a Prime Minister, replacing Jorge del Castillo who resigned in aftermath of the Petroaudios scandal. President Alan García had appointed Simon, who is politically to the left of García, in an effort to mollify the country's poor and nationalists who are considered "hard-line leftists" by the right-wing Peruvian parties.

Resignation
In June 2009, Simon announced that he would resign as prime minister "in the coming weeks", following violence over the land rights of Amazon Indians. He resigned on July 10, 2009 and was replaced on July 11, 2009 by Javier Velásquez Quesquén.

Simon went on to apologize to the indigenous people, acknowledging the government had not properly consulted with the Amazon Indians prior to passing ten controversial laws, designed to ease foreign companies in the exploration of the Amazon for oil, gas and lumber. Simon pledged to work to persuade the Peruvian congress to repeal these controversial laws. Peru's indigenous leaders had launched protest strikes and blockades in April 2009; resulting in 34 persons killed, including 23 policemen; in bloody clashes between the Amazon Indians and the Peruvian police.

Congressman (2011–2016)
In the 2011 general election Simon was elected Congressman for Lambayeque on the list of the Alliance for the Great Change to which his Humanist Party has integrated. He was Second Vice President of Congress for the annual 2011-2012 term. On January 17, 2012, using his congressional vote, he tipped the balance against the lawlessness of Congressman and former Vice President Omar Chehade accused of criminal offenses, This earned him wide criticism from the press and from the majority of the population.  Days later, on January 31, he regretted his vote in favor of avoiding Chehade's lawlessness, not for protecting alleged criminal offenses, but for not respecting the agreement of the Alliance for the Great Change on this issue.

Arrest 
On January 24, 2020, Simón was preliminarily detained for 10 days for having accepted bribes from Odebrecht in the Olmos Project. He was sentenced to house arrest for 36 months.

References 
Article drawn primarily from Spanish-language Wikipedia entry of same name 

1947 births
Living people
Prime Ministers of Peru
United Left (Peru) politicians
Members of the Chamber of Deputies of Peru
Peruvian Humanist Party politicians
People from Lima
Members of the Congress of the Republic of Peru